Art Rudd (October 22, 1890 – April 14, 1968) was an American soccer defender who earned two caps with the U.S. national team, including one at the 1924 Summer Olympics.

National team
Rudd's first caps came at the 1924 Summer Olympics when he played in the U.S. first round win over Estonia.  Following its elimination from the Olympics, the U.S. played two exhibition games.  Rudd played in the second, a 3-1 loss to Ireland.

Professional
Rudd also spent two seasons in the American Soccer League.  He played eighteen games with Fleisher Yarn in 1924-1925 and another nineteen games with Philadelphia Field Club during the 1925-1926 season.

References

1890 births
1968 deaths
American Soccer League (1921–1933) players
American soccer players
Association football defenders
English emigrants to the United States
Fleisher Yarn players
Footballers at the 1924 Summer Olympics
Footballers from Widnes
Olympic soccer players of the United States
Philadelphia Field Club players
Soccer players from Philadelphia
United States men's international soccer players